Helma Mähren-Lehmann ( Mähren; born 23 June 1953) is a German rower who competed in the 1976 Summer Olympics representing East Germany.

She won the gold medal as part of the women's eight.

References

External links
 
 
 
 

1953 births
Living people
East German female rowers
Olympic rowers of East Germany
Rowers at the 1976 Summer Olympics
Olympic gold medalists for East Germany
Olympic medalists in rowing
World Rowing Championships medalists for East Germany
Medalists at the 1976 Summer Olympics
European Rowing Championships medalists
Sportspeople from Brandenburg an der Havel